Lesh is both a surname and a given name. Notable people with the name include:

Surname:
 Fyodor Lesh (1840 - 1903), physician
 Pavel Lesh (1887 - 1915), sport shooter
 Phil Lesh (born 1940), musician
 Richard Lesh, professor
 Ulysses Samuel Lesh (1868-1965), politician

Given name:
 Lesh Shkreli (born 1957), footballer

See also
 Lesch, a surname
 Loesch
 Losch
 LESH
 Phil Lesh and Friends
 Lezhë

Albanian masculine given names